Karl Holl (15 May 1866 – 23 May 1926) was a professor of theology and church history at Tübingen and Berlin and is considered one of the most influential church historians of his era.

Life 
Karl Holl studied philosophy and theology at the Tübinger Stift. He became a member of the Studentenverbindung (student association) Normannia. While serving as a minister in Württemberg, he completed his doctorate and became the lead tutor (Repetent) at the Tübinger Stift in 1891. From 1894 he was active as a research assistant at the Prussian Academy of Sciences at the instigation of Adolf von Harnack. He completed his Habilitation in 1896 at the theological faculty of Berlin. In 1901 he became associate professor (Extraordinarius) of church history at the University of Tübingen, from 1906 he was Professor (Ordinarius) at the University of Berlin. On December 17, 1914, he was admitted as a full member of the Prussian Academy of Sciences. He also served from 1912 to 1926 as “Ephorus” of the Evangelical Theological Seminary, the Stiftung Johanneum, in Berlin. His grave is located at the church cemetery in Stahnsdorf.

Work 
Karl Holl's theological development is characterized by the outlook of the “Tubingen school” of Ferdinand Christian Baur. He published numerous studies on Martin Luther, which made a fundamental contribution to scholarship and remain important today. Holl's works interpret the Lutheran religious and God concept as “Gewissensreligion” (a religion of conscience) and helped spark the “Luther Renaissance.” He returned the doctrine of justification to its place in the center of theology.

He has been called "perhaps the greatest Luther scholar of [his] generation".

Original works 
 Die Sacra Parallela des Johannes Damascenus, 1897
 Enthusiasmus und Bußgewalt beim griechischen Mönchtum, und Studium zu Symeon der Neuen Theologen, 1898
 Fragmente vornicänischer Kirchenväter aus den Sacra Parallela, 1899
 Amphilochius von Ikonium in seinem Verhältnis zu den großen Kappadoziern, 1904
 Die geist. Übungen des Ignatius von Loyola. Eine psychologische Studie, 1905
 Die Rechtfertigungslehre im Licht der Geschichte des Protestantismus, 1906
 Was hat die Rechtfertigungslehre dem modernen Menschen zu sagen?, 1907
 Der Modernismus, 1908
 Johannes Calvin, Rede zur Feier der 400. Wiederkehr des Geburtstages Calvins, 1909
 Die handschriftliche Überlieferung des Epiphanius, 1910
 Thomas Chalmers und die Anfänge der kirchlich-sozialen Bewegung, 1913
 Der Kirchenbegriff des Paulus in seinem Verhältnis zu dem der Urgemeinde, 1921
 Gesammelte Aufsätze zur Kirchengeschichte I.: Luther (1. Was verstand Luther unter Religion? 2. Rechtfertigungslehre in Luthers Vorlesung über den Römerbrief mit besonderer Rücksicht auf die Frage der Heilsgewißheit. 3. Der Neubau der Sittlichkeit. 4. Die Entstehung von Luthers Kirchenbegriff. 5. Luther und das landesherrliche Kirchenregiment. 6. Luthers Urteile über sich selbst. 7. Luther und die Schwärmer. 8. Die Kulturbedeutung der Reformation 9. Luthers Bedeutung für den Fortschritt der Auslegungskunst), 1921
 Augustins innere Entwicklung, 1923
 Urchristentum und Religionsgeschichte, 1924
 Die Entstehung der vier Fastenzeiten in der griechischen Kirche, 1924
 Christliche Reden, 1926
 Gesammelte Aufsätze zur Kirchengeschichte II.: Der Osten, 1927/28
 Gesammelte Aufsätze zur Kirchengeschichte III.: Der Westen, 1928

English translations
 The cultural significance of the Reformation. New York: Meridian Books, 1959
 The Distinctive Elements in Christianity. Edinburgh: T. & T. Clark, 1937.
 What Did Luther Understand by Religion? Philadelphia: Fortress Press, 1977.

See also 
 Theology of Martin Luther

References

External links 

 
 

1866 births
1926 deaths
20th-century German Protestant theologians
20th-century German historians
Reformation historians
University of Tübingen alumni
Academic staff of the University of Tübingen
Academic staff of the Humboldt University of Berlin
Members of the Prussian Academy of Sciences
German male non-fiction writers